Dean Alan Chenoweth (August 27, 1937 – July 31, 1982) was an American hydroplane racing pilot. Known for piloting the famous Miss Budweiser boat and the winner of four American Power Boat Association Gold Cups, he was killed at age 44 in a racing accident on the Columbia River.

Career
Born in Xenia, Ohio, and a long-time resident of Tallahassee, Florida, Chenoweth began his career in motorboat racing at the age of 12. At 15, he won three national championships, in Class A and Class B hydroplanes and Class A stock boats.

Chenoweth moved to unlimited class hydroplane racing in 1968. Between 1968 and 1982, he won four APBA Gold Cups, in 1970, 1973, 1980, and 1981, and won the National High Point Championships four times. Chenoweth also set a record of twenty heat race wins in the first five events of the 1980 season.

Best known as the driver of Bernie Little's famed Miss Budweiser, and owner of a Budweiser distributorship in Tallahassee, where he moved in 1973, Chenoweth survived a number of spectacular accidents, including a massive blowover on Lake Washington at Seattle during a speed record attempt in October 1979.

He was inducted into the Motorsports Hall of Fame of America in 1991.

Death
While piloting Miss Budweiser in 1982, Chenoweth was killed on the Columbia River in Washington on  During Saturday morning qualifying for the next day's Columbia Cup at the Tri-Cities, the boat was traveling at about  when it blew over and impacted inverted. He suffered massive head, neck, and chest injuries; when pulled from the water, he was unconscious and did not have a pulse. Chenoweth was taken to Kennewick General Hospital, and was pronounced dead 45 minutes after the accident.

Less than ten months earlier, hydroplane racing legend Bill Muncey was killed during the last race of the 1981 season at Acapulco, Mexico.

Legacy
Chenoweth's death led Little to develop a closed cockpit for the next Miss Budweiser boat, and the enclosure became standard for unlimited racers. He is memorialized by a fountain in Lake Leon in Tallahassee's Tom Brown Park; he had been named the city's Man of the Year for 1981.

References

External links
Hydroplane History – Dynamo Dean and the Griffon Bud

H1 Unlimited
1937 births
1982 deaths
Sportspeople from Tallahassee, Florida
Sportspeople from Xenia, Ohio
American motorboat racers
Motorboat racers who died while racing
Sports deaths in Washington (state)
APBA Challenge Cup
American people of Cornish descent